Johan Kellgren Areskoug (18 August 1906 – 21 December 1996) was a Swedish sprinter. He competed in the Olympics in 1932 and 1936 and won a bronze medal at the 1938 European Championships in the 400 m hurdles.

Career
At the 1932 Summer Olympics in Los Angeles Areskoug competed in both the 400 m and the 400 m hurdles. In the 400 m he went out in the heats, but in the hurdles he qualified for the final, running his personal best time of 53.2 in the semi-finals. In the final he only managed 54.6, finishing sixth and last. Four years later in Berlin he only competed in the 400 m hurdles, failing to qualify from the heats.

Areskoug placed third in the 400 m hurdles at the 1938 European Championships in Paris, running 53.6 and losing only to Prudent Joye and József Kovács.

Areskoug held the Swedish 400 m hurdles title in 1931, 1933, 1935–38. He placed second in the 400 m hurdles in 1929–30 and in the 110 m hurdles in 1930–31 and 1935–36.

References

1906 births
1996 deaths
Sportspeople from Jönköping
Swedish male hurdlers
Athletes (track and field) at the 1932 Summer Olympics
Athletes (track and field) at the 1936 Summer Olympics
Olympic athletes of Sweden
European Athletics Championships medalists